Léon Vandermeiren (8 January 1896 – 3 May 1955) was a Belgian footballer. He played in one match for the Belgium national football team in 1925.

References

External links
 

1896 births
1955 deaths
Belgian footballers
Belgium international footballers
Place of birth missing
Association football goalkeepers
R. Daring Club Molenbeek players